Central Avenue Historic District is a national historic district in Glendale, Queens, New York.  It includes 104 contributing buildings built in 1916.  They consist of three story brick tenements with two apartments per floor.  Buildings feature front facades and amber iron-spot brick.

It was listed on the National Register of Historic Places in 1983.

References

Residential buildings completed in 1916
Glendale, Queens
Historic districts on the National Register of Historic Places in Queens, New York
Historic districts in Queens, New York